Twin Earth may refer to:
 Earth analog or Twin Earth, a theoretical other planet with conditions similar to Earth
 Twin Earth thought experiment by philosopher Hilary Putnam, in defense of meaning externalism.
 Twin Earths, a comic strip
 Twin and earth, a type of electricity cable

See also
Counter-Earth